is a 1954 black and white Japanese film directed by Mitsuo Hirotsu.

The film is one of many films about fictional character Zenigata Heiji.

Cast 
 Kazuo Hasegawa as Zenigata Heiji
 Raizo Ichikawa
 Yumiko Hasegawa
 Tamao Nakamura

References 

Japanese black-and-white films
1954 films
Films directed by Mitsuo Hirotsu
Daiei Film films
1950s Japanese films